The 2015 UEFA European Under-21 Championship was the 20th edition of the UEFA European Under-21 Championship, a biennial international football competition for men's under-21 national teams organised by UEFA. The final tournament was hosted for the first time in the Czech Republic from 15 to 30 June 2015, after their bid was selected by the UEFA Executive Committee on 20 March 2012 in Istanbul.

Players born on or after 1 January 1992 were eligible to participate in the competition. Fifty-two teams participated in a qualification tournament, taking place between March 2013 and October 2014, to determine the seven teams that would join the final tournament hosts. Holders Spain were not able to defend their title after being eliminated in the qualification play-offs by Serbia.

In the final, played at the Eden Arena in Prague, Sweden defeated Portugal 4–3 in a penalty shootout, after a goalless draw at the end of extra-time. In doing so, the Swedish team won their first title in this competition, having previously lost the 1992 final, and secured their first-ever title in UEFA youth competitions on the men's side.

By reaching the semi-finals, Denmark, Germany, Portugal and Sweden also qualified for the 2016 Summer Olympics men's football tournament in Brazil.

Qualification

Qualification for the final tournament of the 2015 UEFA European Under-21 Championship consisted of two rounds: a group stage and a play-off round. The group stage draw took place on 31 January 2013 in Nyon, Switzerland, and distributed 52 national teams into ten groups of five or six teams. Each group was contested in a double round-robin system, where teams played each other twice, at home and away. The ten group winners and the four best second-placed teams advanced to the play-off round, where they were paired by draw into seven two-legged ties. The play-off winners joined the Czech Republic in the final tournament.

Qualified teams
The following teams qualified for the 2015 UEFA European Under-21 Championship final tournament:

1 Bold indicates champion for that year. Italic indicates host for that year.
2 As West Germany
3 As Yugoslavia
4 As Serbia and Montenegro
5 As Czechoslovakia

Venues
The competition was played at four venues in three host cities: Eden Arena and Generali Arena (in Prague), Andrův stadion (in Olomouc), and Stadion Miroslava Valenty (in Uherské Hradiště).

Match officials
Six refereeing teams took charge of matches at the final tournament:

Seeding
The draw for the final tournament took place at 18:00 CET on 6 November 2014, at the Clarion Congress Hotel in Prague. England, the highest-ranked team according to the competition coefficient rankings, and the host team, Czech Republic, were seeded and automatically assigned to separate groups. The second and third-ranked teams in the coefficient rankings, Italy and Germany, were also seeded and drawn into separate groups, while the four unseeded teams were drawn into the remaining positions of the two groups.

Squads

Each national team had to submit a squad of 23 players, three of whom had to be goalkeepers. If a player was injured or ill severely enough to prevent his participation in the tournament before his team's first match, he could be replaced by another player.

Format of competitions

The eight finalists were drawn into two groups of four teams. As hosts, Czech Republic were seeded in group A, while England, the best-ranked team in the UEFA coefficient ranking, were seeded in group B. In each group, teams played matches against each other in a round-robin system, and the top two teams advanced to the semi-finals.

The provisional schedule was released by UEFA on 10 November 2014, and confirmed on 2 December 2014. All times are in Central European Summer Time (UTC+02:00).

After the conclusion of the group stage, the following four teams from UEFA qualified for the Olympic football tournament.

Tie-breaking
If two or more teams were equal on points on completion of the group matches, the following tie-breaking criteria were applied:
 Higher number of points obtained in the matches played between the teams in question;
 Superior goal difference resulting from the matches played between the teams in question;
 Higher number of goals scored in the matches played between the teams in question;
If, after having applied criteria 1 to 3, teams still had an equal ranking, criteria 1 to 3 were reapplied exclusively to the matches between the teams in question to determine their final rankings. If this procedure did not lead to a decision, criteria 4 to 6 were applied.

If only two teams were tied (according to criteria 1–5) after having met in the last match of the group stage, their ranking would have been determined by a penalty shoot-out.

Group A

Group B

Knockout stage
In the knockout stage, extra time and penalty shoot-out were used to decide the winner if necessary.

Bracket

Semi-finals

Final

Goalscorers
3 goals
 Jan Kliment

2 goals

 Kevin Volland
 Marco Benassi
 João Mário
 John Guidetti
 Simon Tibbling

1 goal

 Martin Frýdek
 Pavel Kadeřábek
 Ladislav Krejčí
 Uffe Bech
 Rasmus Falk
 Viktor Fischer
 Pione Sisto
 Jannik Vestergaard
 Jesse Lingard
 Nathan Redmond
 Emre Can
 Matthias Ginter
 Nico Schulz
 Andrea Belotti
 Domenico Berardi
 Ivan Cavaleiro
 Ricardo Horta
 Gonçalo Paciência
 Ricardo
 Bernardo Silva
 Filip Đuričić
 Oscar Hiljemark
 Isaac Kiese Thelin
 Robin Quaison

Awards

Golden Boot
The Golden Boot is given to the player who scored the most goals during the tournament.

Player of the tournament
After the tournament the U21 EURO Player of the Tournament is selected by the UEFA Technical Observers.

Team of the tournament
After the tournament the Under-21 Team of the Tournament is selected by the UEFA Technical Observers.

Medal table

Qualification for the 2016 Summer Olympics
Same as previous Under-21 Championships that were held one year prior to the Olympics, UEFA used the tournament to determine which men's under-23 national teams from Europe qualify for the Olympic football tournament. The four teams which advanced to the semi-finals qualified for the 2016 Summer Olympics in Brazil. However, England are ineligible for the Olympics and they are not an Olympic nation. Had England reached the semi-finals, the last Olympic spot would go to the winner of an Olympic play-off match between the two group third-placed teams, which was scheduled to be played on 28 June 2015, 18:00, at Stadion Miroslava Valenty, Uherské Hradiště. However, when England failed to advance out of the group stage, this was cancelled.

1 Bold indicates champion for that year. Italic indicates host for that year. Statistics include all Olympic format (current Olympic under-23 format started in 1992).
2 The team represented the United Team of Germany in 1956, and the Federal Republic of Germany (i.e., West Germany) in 1972, 1984 and 1988.

Broadcasting
Countries who are not covered by a local broadcaster had the matches broadcast on YouTube.

Ambassador
Former Czech Republic midfielder Pavel Nedvěd was the ambassador for the tournament.

Notes

References

External links

UEFA European Under-21 Championship – History: 2015
Official website (Czech)
Official programme
Tournament review

 
2015
UNder-21
2014–15 in Czech football
Football at the 2016 Summer Olympics – Men's qualification
2015 UEFA European Under-21 Championship
2015 UEFA European Under-21 Championship
June 2015 sports events in Europe
2015 in youth association football
Sport in Olomouc
Sport in Uherské Hradiště
Sports competitions in Prague
2010s in Prague